was a Japanese samurai of the Sengoku period and early Edo period.
Who served the Tokugawa clan. He served as one of Ieyasu's "three magistrates".

Biography
Yasukage was born as the son of Amano Kagetaka. Yasukage worked from a young age as a servant close to Tokugawa Ieyasu, accompanying Ieyasu even when he became a hostage.

Yasukage supported Ieyasu at Battle of Azukizaka (1564) in conflict with monks from the Ikkō-ikki religious band in Mikawa.

In 1565, he was named one of Mikawa's San-bugyô, or Three Commissioners (along with Honda Shigetsugu and Koriki Kiyonaga). Yasukage was known for his patience, Shigetsugu for his fortitude, and Kiyonaga for his leniency.

In 1573, he assisted Okubo Tadayo in a well-known night raid on the Takeda army following the Battle of Mikatagahara.

In 1586, Yasukage was assigned to lead command of the ninja from Koga Domain.

After the Battle of Sekigahara, from 1600–1611, he was the head of Kōkokuji Castle (10,000 koku) in Suruga Province.

References

Samurai
1537 births
1613 deaths
Fudai daimyo